This is a list of rolled foods. Many types of rolled foods exist, including those in the forms of dishes, prepared foods, snacks and candies.

Rolled foods

See also

 List of dumplings
 List of stuffed dishes
 Roll (disambiguation)

References

Rolled Foods